Ready to Fly is an album by the New Zealand band the Verlaines. It was released in 1991 by Slash Records. The album was recorded in Sydney, Australia.

Critical reception

The Indianapolis Star noted that "it's reminiscent of the Beatles without being a Beatles ripoff, and many of the songs could be show music without losing any of their pop-rock atmosphere." The Toronto Star opined that "the songs off Ready to Fly prove the Verlaines have the power trio thing down, but it's still too concerned with tasteful rather than tasty." The Columbus Dispatch wrote that, "at its busiest and most dense, the album is still about guitars (electric and acoustic), melody, a killer hook."

Track listing
All songs written by Graeme Downes.
"Gloom Junky" – 3:32
"Overdrawn" – 2:35
"Tremble" – 2:50
"Such As I" – 3:18
"Hurricane" – 2:25
"War in My Head" – 4:47
"Inside Out" – 2:29
"See You Tomorrow" – 3:36
"Hole in the Ground" – 3:31
"Ready to Fly" – 4:16
"Moonlight on Snow" – 4:02
"Hold On" – 3:28

References 

The Verlaines albums
1991 albums
Slash Records albums